Kambui Olujimi (born 1976) is a New York-based visual artist working across disciplines using installation, photography, performance, tapestry, works on paper, video, large sculptures and painting. His artwork reflects on public discourse, mythology, historical narrative, social practices, exchange, mediated cultures, resilience and autonomy.

Early life and education 
Olujimi was born and grew up in the Bedford-Stuyvesant neighborhood of Brooklyn in New York City.

In 1996, he attended Bard College. In 2002, he received a BFA from Parsons School of Design. He attended the Skowhegan School of Painting and Sculpture in Maine in 2006. In 2013, Olujimi received an MFA from Columbia University School of the Arts.

Career 
Reviews of his work have appeared in publications including Art in America, The New York Times, The New Yorker, Modern Painters, Artforum, Hyperallergic, and The Brooklyn Rail. Throughout his career he has received numerous grants and fellowships including from A Blade of Grass, the Jerome Foundation, and the Fine Arts Work Center in Provincetown. He has also collaborated with interdisciplinary artist Coco Fusco.

Olujimi's visual work is in the permanent collections of the Brooklyn Museum of Art and the Cleveland Art Museum.

Olujimi has been connected with the Catharine Clark Gallery since 2010.

He teaches in the Visual Art programs at Columbia University and Cooper Union.

Olujimi was one of the subjects of the short feature Through a Lens Darkly, concerning the struggle for African American photographers to receive recognition.

Personal life 
Some of Olujimi's work is inspired by Bedford-Stuyvesant community leader and activist Catherine Arline, a woman he considered a surrogate mother and referred to as his guardian angel. Olujimi described his series of portraits of Arline as both a "mourning practice" and an experiment in "memory work."

Olujimi currently lives and works in Queens, New York.

Honors

Awards 
 2021: Awarded Joan Mitchell Fellowship by the Joan Mitchell Foundation

Artist-in-residency 
 2005: BCAT / Rotunda Gallery Multimedia Artist Residency (New York, NY)
 2006: Skowhegan School of Painting and Sculpture (Skowhegan, ME)
 2007-2009: Apexart: Outbound Residency to Kellerberin, Australia (Kellerberin, Australia)
 2007-2009: Fine Arts Work Center at Provincetown (Provincetown, MA), 2nd Year Fellow
 2009: Santa Fe Art Institute (Santa Fe, NM)
 2009: Bemis Center for Contemporary Arts (Omaha, NE)
 2010: Acadia Summer Arts Program, (Mt. Desert, ME)
 2011: The Center for Book Arts (New York, NY)
 2013: Tropical Lab 7 (Singapore)
 2014: Franconia Sculpture Park (Franconia, MN)
 2015: Civitella Ranieri (Umbertide, Italy)
 2015: Meet Factory (Prague, Czech Republic)
 2015: The Lower Manhattan Cultural Council (New York, NY), Process Space Residency
 2015: The Fountainhead Residency (Miami, FL)
2016: Queenspace Residency (Long Island City, NY)
 2017: Robert Rauschenberg Residency (Captiva, FL)
2018: MacDowell Colony (Peterborough, NH)
2019: Black Rock Senegal (Dakar, Senegal)

Exhibitions 
Olujimi's work has been exhibited in a number of institutions nationally and internationally: Real Art Ways (Hartford, CT), CUE Arts Foundation (New York, NY), MIT List Visual Arts Center (Cambridge, MA), Apexart (New York, NY), Art in General (Brooklyn, NY), The Sundance Film Festival (Park City, UT), Smithsonian Institution, (Washington D.C.), Madison Museum of Contemporary Art (Madison, WI), Museum of Contemporary Art Los Angeles (Los Angeles, CA),  Museum of Modern Art (New York, NY), Studio Museum in Harlem (New York, NY) and Yerba Buena Center for the Arts (San Francisco, CA), Museo Nacional Reina Sofia (Madrid, Spain), Kiasma (Helsinki, Finland), Para Site (Hong Kong, China), The Jim Thompson Art Center (Bangkok, Thailand), Contemporary Arts Museum Houston (Houston, TX), The Blanton Museum of Art (Austin, TX), The Newark Museum *(Newark, NJ), the Brooklyn Museum (Brooklyn, NY), and Project for Empty Space, Newark, NJ. He has given artist lectures in many institutions nationally and internationally, including Carleton University, Ottawa, University of Buffalo, Rhode Island School of Design.

Works and publications 
 
 
 
 
Olujimi, Kambui. Zulu Time; essays by Sampada Aranke, Gregory Volk, and Leah Kolb. Madison, WI: Madison Museum of Contemporary Art. 2017. Exhibition Catalogue.

Sources 
 Harris, Thomas A, and Kambui Olujimi. Through a Lens Darkly: Philosophy of the Artist. , 2014. Internet resource.

References

External links 
 
 Kambui Olujimi at Museum of Modern Art
 

American artists
Living people
1976 births
People from Bedford–Stuyvesant, Brooklyn
Columbia University School of the Arts alumni
Bard College alumni
Parsons College alumni
Skowhegan School of Painting and Sculpture alumni